Pieter Heinrich Rodgers  (born 23 June 1962) is a South African former rugby union player.

Playing career
Rodgers went to school in Harrismith in the Free State and represented Eastern Free State at the annual Craven Week tournament in 1980. After finishing school, Rodgers moved to Pretoria to study at the University of Pretoria. He made his provincial debut for Northern Transvaal in 1984. Rodgers also played for Transvaal, but finished his career with Northern Transvaal. Although he was known as a specialist loosehead prop, he could also pack down on the tighthead side.

Rodgers made his test debut for the Springboks against the World XV on 26 August 1989 at Newlands in Cape Town. He also played in the second test against the World XV as well as the 1992 match against the All Blacks. Rodgers toured with the Springboks to England and France in 1992, playing in the two test matches against France. He also played in seven tour matches for the Springboks.

Test history

See also
List of South Africa national rugby union players – Springbok no. 554

References

1962 births
Living people
South African rugby union players
South Africa international rugby union players
People from Harrismith
Rugby union players from the Free State (province)
Rugby union props
Blue Bulls players